Federico Mueller (born 9 September 1888, date of death unknown) was a Chilean middle-distance runner. He competed in the men's 800 metres at the 1912 Summer Olympics.

References

1888 births
Year of death missing
Athletes (track and field) at the 1912 Summer Olympics
Chilean male middle-distance runners
Olympic athletes of Chile
People from Antofagasta